The Harrisburg Giants were a U.S. professional Negro league baseball team based in Harrisburg, Pennsylvania.  Originally formed in April 1890 by Colonel William "C.W." Strothers as an amateur team, they became semi-professional by 1894. They joined the Eastern Colored League (ECL) for the 1924 season with Hall of Fame center fielder Oscar Charleston as playing manager.  The Giants became known primarily for their hitting; along with Charleston, outfielder/first baseman Heavy Johnson, winner of the batting triple crown for the 1923 Kansas City Monarchs, was signed away from the rival Negro National League.  Speedy outfielder Fats Jenkins, a well-known professional basketball player and member of the New York Rens, also played for Harrisburg throughout its tenure in the ECL.

Harrisburg finished in the middle of the pack in its first season, winning 26 and losing 28 for a fifth-place spot (out of eight teams).  In 1925, however, the Giants picked up the pace, challenging defending champion Hilldale before falling just short with a 37-18 record.  1926 saw the Giants add shortstop/third baseman John Beckwith from the Baltimore Black Sox, and finished second again, this time behind the Bacharach Giants.

In 1927, the Harrisburg Giants fell in second place again behind the Bacharach Giants, with a 41-32 record.  The club dropped out of the ECL in 1928 to play an independent schedule, whereupon most of its best players signed with other teams. From here, famed player Spottswood Poles led the team but was rumored to not have "deep enough pockets" as Colonel Strothers did.

After Colonel Strothers' death in 1933, there were several other black professional “Giants” teams representing Harrisburg, but baseball slowed as World War II arose in the 1940s.

Following World War II, there weren't any Negro teams in Harrisburg, so The Harrisburg Giants were reincarnated in the 1953 by Richard Felton with Spottswood Poles again managing the team. By the next year the Giants were an inaugurating team of the new Eastern Negro League, where they won the title with a 16-6 season. They continued to play on City Island through 1957.

See also
History of baseball in the United States
Sports in South Central Pennsylvania

References

External links
The History of Black Baseball in Harrisburg, Pennsylvania Afrolumensproject.org
Harrisburg Giants State Historic Marker Historic Marker Database

Negro league baseball teams
Defunct sports teams in Pennsylvania
Defunct baseball teams in Pennsylvania
1922 establishments in Pennsylvania
1927 disestablishments in Pennsylvania
Baseball teams established in 1922
Baseball teams disestablished in 1927
Sports in Harrisburg, Pennsylvania